José de Magalhães Pinto (28 June 1909 – 6 March 1996) was a Brazilian politician and banker.

Magalhães Pinto was born in Santo Antônio do Monte, in the state of Minas Gerais. He was the Governor of this state from 1961 to 1966. While governor, Magalhães Pinto became the leading civilian in the opposition movement. In 1964, Magalhães Pinto and Field Marshal Humberto de Alencar Castelo Branco, the chief of staff of the army, "emerged as the chief coordinators of the conspiracy" to depose President João Goulart by the Brazilian military. This conspiracy proved successful, and ushered in "two decades of strict military rule."

After leaving the governorship, he became the Minister of Foreign Affairs in the military government.  He later left the government to run for and serve in the Senate, and served as the President of the Senate from 1975 to 1977.

See also
List of Governors of Minas Gerais
1964 Brazilian coup d'état

References

1909 births
1996 deaths
Presidents of the Federal Senate (Brazil)
Governors of Minas Gerais
Foreign ministers of Brazil
Military dictatorship in Brazil